Zeferino Nandayapa (born 26 August 1931, Copainalá – died 28 December 2010, Tlalnepantla) was a Mexican folk and classical marimba player. In Mexico City, his classical music teachers were Blas Galindo, María García Genda, Carlos Chávez and Carlos Jiménez Mabarak. His grandson Gustavo Nandayapa is known as "Don Ruiditos" (Mr. Noises) https://www.youtube.com/watch?v=AcHndvIF3UY

He formed the Marimba Nandayapa in 1956, a popular marimba band that has traveled to several countries performing Mexican and Latin-American folk music. Zeferino Nandayapa has been a soloist with the Royal Philharmonic Orchestra in London, and the Community of Madrid Orchestra.

Death
Nandayapa died on 28 December 2010 caused by a fatal slip, aged 79, in Tlalnepantla.

References

External links
 Photos
 La Sierra University
 Zeferino Nandayapa interview
 Jornada.Unam.Mx

1931 births
2010 deaths
Marimbists
Mexican classical musicians
Classical percussionists
People from Chiapas
Accidental deaths from falls
Accidental deaths in Mexico
20th-century classical musicians